Bruno Henrique da Silva Souza (born 10 September 1988 in Londrina),  known as Bruno Henrique, is a Brazilian footballer who plays as a central defender.

References

External links

CBF 
placar 

1988 births
Living people
Sportspeople from Londrina
Brazilian footballers
Association football defenders
Paraná Clube players
Avaí FC players